The following is an overview of 1931 in film, including significant events, a list of films released and notable births and deaths.

Top-grossing films (U.S.)
The top ten 1931 released films by box office gross in North America are as follows:

Events
 January 5: RKO acquires the producing and distribution arm of Pathé for $4.6 million.
 June 20: Monogram Pictures releases its first film, Ships of Hate.
 July 7: Anti-competitive practices disclosed about certain distributors and producers in Canada.
 November 17: E. R. Tinker elected president of Fox Films replacing Harley L. Clarke.
 December 14: RKO refinancing plan approved.

Best money stars
Variety reported the following as the biggest male stars in the U.S. in alphabetical order although grouped George Arliss and Ronald Colman together as having equal ranking.

The following were the biggest women names in the U.S. in alphabetical order but again grouped two actresses together to denote they were ranked the same.

Academy Awards

The 4th Academy Awards were awarded to films completed and screened released between August 1, 1930, and July 31, 1931, by the Academy of Motion Picture Arts and Sciences.

Most Nominations: Cimarron (RKO Pictures) – 7

Major Awards
 Best Picture: Cimarron – RKO
 Best Director: Norman Taurog – Skippy
 Best Actor: Lionel Barrymore – A Free Soul
 Best Actress: Marie Dressler – Min and Bill

Most Awards: Cimarron – 3 (Best Picture; Best Adaptation and Best Art Direction)

Cimarron was the first Western to win Best Picture, and would remain the only one to do so for 59 years (until Dances with Wolves won in 1991). It received a then-record seven nominations, and was the first film to win more than two awards.

The 5th Academy Awards were conducted by the Academy of Motion Picture Arts and Sciences on November 18, 1932, at a ceremony held at The Ambassador Hotel in Los Angeles, California. The ceremony was hosted by Conrad Nagel. Films screened in Los Angeles between August 1, 1931, and July 31, 1932, were eligible to receive awards.

Most nominations: Arrowsmith (Samuel Goldwyn Productions) and The Champ (Metro-Goldwyn-Mayer) – 4

Major Awards
Best Actor: Wallace Beery – The Champ and Fredric March – Dr. Jekyll and Mr. Hyde
Best Actress: Helen Hayes – The Sin of Madelon Claudet
Best Director: Frank Borzage – Bad Girl

Most Awards: Bad Girl  (Best Director and Best Adaptation) and The Champ (Best Actor and Best Original Story) – 2

Note: The Academy Award for Best Picture went to 1932's Grand Hotel.

1931 film releases

January–March
January 1931
3 January
The Criminal Code
9 January
Little Caesar
17 January
Other Men's Women
30 January
City Lights
February 1931
9 February
Cimarron
14 February
Dracula
28 February
Parlor, Bedroom and Bath
March 1931
5 March
The Speckled Band
6 March
Ten Cents a Dance
14 March
Kiki
20 March
The Sleeping Cardinal
21 March
Honor Among Lovers
29 March
Bad Sister

April–June
April 1931
4 April
The Front Page
6 April
A Connecticut Yankee
15 April
Bachelor Apartment
18 April
City Streets
The Secret Six
23 April
The Public Enemy
24 April
Dracula
30 April
Iron Man
May 1931
1 May
The Millionaire
11 May
M
16 May
Indiscreet
22 May
Svengali
23 May
Trader Horn
June 1931
13 June
The Maltese Falcon
20 June
A Free Soul
21 June
The Black Camel
27 June
I Take This Woman
28 June
Goldie

July–September
July 1931
11 July
Smart Money
August 1931
1 August
The Smiling Lieutenant
Tabu
7 August
Huckleberry Finn
The Miracle Woman
8 August
Bought!
Night Nurse
13 August
Bad Girl
15 August
Pardon Us
22 August
An American Tragedy
Guilty Hands
29 August
The Last Flight
This Modern Age
September 1931
1 September
Waterloo Bridge
5 September
Daughter of the Dragon 
Secrets of a Secretary
The Squaw Man
Street Scene
12 September
Alexander Hamilton 
18 September
Peludópolis (Argentina)
19 September
Monkey Business
26 September
Five Star Final
Sidewalks of New York
30 September
Alice in Wonderland

October–December
October 1931
3 October
Palmy Days
10 October
24 Hours
24 October
The Sin of Madelon Claudet
31 October
Platinum Blonde
November 1931
1 November
The Cisco Kid
7 November
The Mad Genius
9 November
The Champ
10 November
Secret Service
21 November
Frankenstein
Possessed
28 November
Battling with Buffalo Bill
December 1931
2 December
Anna Christie (Germany)
3 December
Blonde Crazy
7 December
Arrowsmith
10 December
The Struggle
12 December
Private Lives
17 December
Tonight or Never
24 December
Dr. Jekyll and Mr. Hyde
26 December
Mata Hari

Notable films released in 1931
United States unless stated

0-9
24 Hours, directed by Marion Gering, starring Clive Brook, Kay Francis and Miriam Hopkins

A
Alam Ara (The Light of the World) (lost), directed by Ardeshir Irani – (India)
Alexander Hamilton, directed by John G. Adolfi, starring George Arliss
Alibi (lost), directed by Leslie S. Hiscott – (GB)
Alice in Wonderland, directed by Bud Pollard
Alone (Sola), directed by Henri Diamant-Berger – (France)
Alone (Odna), directed by Leonid Trauberg and Grigori Kozintsev – (USSR)
An American Tragedy, directed by Josef von Sternberg, starring Phillips Holmes and Sylvia Sidney
Arrowsmith, directed by John Ford, starring Ronald Colman and Helen Hayes

B
Bachelor Apartment, starring and directed by Lowell Sherman with Irene Dunne
The Bachelor Father, directed by Robert Z. Leonard, starring Marion Davies and Ray Milland
Bad Girl, directed by Frank Borzage, starring Sally Eilers and James Dunn
Bad Sister, directed by Hobart Henley, starring Conrad Nagel, Sidney Fox, Bette Davis, Humphrey Bogart and ZaSu Pitts
Berlin-Alexanderplatz, directed by Phil Jutzi, starring Heinrich George, based on the 1929 novel by Alfred Döblin – (Germany)
The Black Camel, directed by Hamilton MacFadden, starring Warner Oland, Sally Eilers and Bela Lugosi
Blonde Crazy, directed by Roy Del Ruth, starring James Cagney and Joan Blondell
Bought!, directed by Archie Mayo, starring Constance Bennett
Business Under Distress (To neznáte Hadimršku), Karel Lamač and Martin Frič – (Czechoslovakia)

C
The Champ, directed by King Vidor, starring Wallace Beery and Jackie Cooper
The Cheat, directed by George Abbott, starring Tallulah Bankhead
La Chienne (The Bitch), directed by Jean Renoir, starring Michel Simon – (France)
Cimarron, directed by Wesley Ruggles, starring Richard Dix and Irene Dunne
The Cisco Kid, directed by Irving Cummings, starring Warner Baxter
City Lights, a Charlie Chaplin film
City Streets, directed by Rouben Mamoulian, starring Gary Cooper and Sylvia Sidney
A Connecticut Yankee, directed by David Butler, starring Will Rogers
The Criminal Code, directed by Howard Hawks, starring Walter Huston

D
Daughter of the Dragon, directed by Lloyd Corrigan, starring Anna May Wong, Warner Oland and Sessue Hayakawa
David Golder, directed by Julien Duvivier – (France)
Dishonored, directed by Josef von Sternberg, starring Marlene Dietrich and Victor McLaglen
Down River, directed by Peter Godfrey, starring Charles Laughton – (GB)
Dr. Jekyll and Mr. Hyde, directed by Rouben Mamoulian, starring Fredric March and Miriam Hopkins
Dracula, directed by Tod Browning, starring Bela Lugosi
Dracula, directed by George Melford, starring Carlos Villarías

E
Elisabeth of Austria (Elisabeth von Österreich), directed by Adolf Trotz, starring Lil Dagover and Paul Otto – (Germany)
Emil and the Detectives (Emil und die Detektive), directed by Gerhard Lamprecht, starring Rolf Wenkhaus, Käthe Haack and Fritz Rasp – (Germany)
Expensive Women, directed by Hobart Henley, starring Dolores Costello

F
Five and Ten, directed by Robert Z. Leonard, starring Marion Davies and Leslie Howard
Five Star Final, directed by Mervyn LeRoy, starring Edward G. Robinson
Frankenstein, directed by James Whale, starring Boris Karloff, Colin Clive and Mae Clarke
A Free Soul, directed by Clarence Brown, starring Norma Shearer, Leslie Howard, Lionel Barrymore and Clark Gable
From Saturday to Sunday (Ze soboty na neděli), directed by Gustav Machatý – (Czechoslovakia)
The Front Page, directed by Lewis Milestone, starring Adolphe Menjou and Pat O'Brien

G
Girls About Town, directed by George Cukor, starring Kay Francis, Joel McCrea and Lilyan Tashman
Goldie, directed by Benjamin Stoloff, starring Jean Harlow and Spencer Tracy
The Guardsman, directed by Sidney Franklin, starring Alfred Lunt and Lynn Fontanne
Guilty Hands, directed by W. S. Van Dyke, starring Lionel Barrymore and Kay Francis

H
Hell Divers, directed by George Hill, starring Wallace Beery, Clark Gable and Conrad Nagel
Her Grace Commands (Ihre Hoheit befiehlt), directed by Hanns Schwarz, starring Willy Fritsch and Käthe von Nagy – (Germany)
Hobson's Choice (lost), directed by Thomas Bentley – (GB)
Honor Among Lovers, directed by Dorothy Arzner, starring Claudette Colbert and Fredric March
The Hound of the Baskervilles, directed by Gareth Gundrey – (GB)
Huckleberry Finn, directed by Norman Taurog, starring Jackie Coogan
Hyppolit, the Butler (Hyppolit, a lakáj), directed by István Székely – (Hungary)

I
I Take This Woman, directed by Marion Gering, starring Gary Cooper and Carole Lombard
Indiscreet, directed by Leo McCarey, starring Gloria Swanson and Ben Lyon
Iron Man, directed by Tod Browning, starring Lew Ayres and Jean Harlow
It's a Wise Child, directed by Robert Z. Leonard, starring Marion Davies

J
Just a Gigolo, directed by Jack Conway, starring William Haines

K
Kalidas (lost), directed by H. M. Reddy – (Tamil)
Kameradschaft (Comradeship), directed by G. W. Pabst – (Germany)
Kiki, directed by Sam Taylor, starring Mary Pickford
Der Kongreß tanzt (The Congress Dances), directed by Erik Charell, starring Lilian Harvey, Willy Fritsch, Conrad Veidt and Lil Dagover – (Germany)

L
The Last Flight, directed by William Dieterle, starring Richard Barthelmess
Limite, directed by Mário Peixoto – (Brazil)
Little Caesar, directed by Mervyn LeRoy, starring Edward G. Robinson, Douglas Fairbanks Jr. and Glenda Farrell

M
M, directed by Fritz Lang, starring Peter Lorre – (Germany)
The Mad Genius, directed by Michael Curtiz, starring John Barrymore
Mädchen in Uniform, directed by Leontine Sagan, starring Hertha Thiele – (Germany)
The Maltese Falcon, directed by Roy Del Ruth, starring Bebe Daniels, Ricardo Cortez and Una Merkel
Marius, directed by Alexander Korda, starring Raimu and Pierre Fresnay – (France)
Mata Hari, directed by George Fitzmaurice, starring Greta Garbo, Ramon Novarro, Lewis Stone and Lionel Barrymore
Le Million, directed by René Clair – (France)
The Millionaire, directed by John G. Adolfi, starring George Arliss
The Miracle Woman, directed by Frank Capra, starring Barbara Stanwyck
Monkey Business, directed by Norman Z. McLeod, starring the Marx Brothers
My Sin, directed by George Abbott, starring Tallulah Bankhead and Fredric March

N
The Neighbor's Wife and Mine (Madamu to nyōbō), directed by Heinosuke Gosho – (Japan)
A Night in Montmartre, directed by Leslie S. Hiscott – (GB)
Night Nurse, directed by William A. Wellman, starring Barbara Stanwyck, Ben Lyon, Joan Blondell and Clark Gable
À Nous la Liberté (Freedom for Us), directed by René Clair – (France)

O
Other Men's Women, directed by William A. Wellman, starring Grant Withers, Regis Toomey and Mary Astor

P
Palmy Days, directed by A. Edward Sutherland, starring Eddie Cantor
Pardon Us, directed by James Parrott, starring Laurel and Hardy
Parlor, Bedroom and Bath, directed by Edward Sedgwick, starring Buster Keaton
The Peach Girl (Tao hua qi xue ji), directed by Bu Wancang, starring Ruan Lingyu – (China)
Peludópolis (lost), directed by Quirino Cristiani – (Argentina)
Platinum Blonde, directed by Frank Capra, starring Loretta Young, Robert Williams and Jean Harlow
Possessed, directed by Clarence Brown, starring Joan Crawford and Clark Gable
Private Lives, directed by Sidney Franklin, starring Norma Shearer and Robert Montgomery
The Public Enemy, directed by William A. Wellman, starring James Cagney, Jean Harlow and Joan Blondell

Q
Quick Millions, directed by Rowland Brown, starring Spencer Tracy

R
Revenge on the Brother (Enteghm-e baradar), directed Ebrahim Moradi – (Iran)

S
Sally in Our Alley, directed by Maurice Elvey, starring Gracie Fields – (GB)
Secret Service, directed by J. Walter Ruben, starring Richard Dix
The Secret Six, directed by George Hill, starring Wallace Beery, Lewis Stone, Johnny Mack Brown, Jean Harlow and Clark Gable
Secrets of a Secretary, directed by George Abbott, starring Claudette Colbert and Herbert Marshall
Sidewalks of New York, directed by Zion Myers and Jules White, starring Buster Keaton, Anita Page and Cliff Edwards
The Sin of Madelon Claudet, directed by Edgar Selwyn, starring Helen Hayes
The Sleeping Cardinal, directed by Leslie S. Hiscott, starring Arthur Wontner – (GB)
Smart Money, directed by Alfred E. Green, starring Edward G. Robinson and James Cagney
The Smiling Lieutenant, directed by Ernst Lubitsch, starring Maurice Chevalier, Claudette Colbert and Miriam Hopkins
The Speckled Band, directed by Jack Raymond, starring Raymond Massey – (GB)
A Spray of Plum Blossoms (Yī jiǎn méi), directed by Bu Wancang, starring Ruan Lingyu – (China)
The Squaw Man, directed by Cecil B. DeMille, starring Warner Baxter and Lupe Vélez
The Stolen Jools, directed by William C. McGann
Street Scene, directed by King Vidor, starring Sylvia Sidney and Estelle Taylor
The Struggle, directed by D.W. Griffith
Svengali, directed by Archie Mayo, starring John Barrymore and Marian Marsh

T
Tabu: A Story of the South Seas, directed by F. W. Murnau
Tell England, directed by Anthony Asquith and Geoffrey Barkas – (GB)
Ten Cents a Dance, directed by Lionel Barrymore, starring Barbara Stanwyck and Ricardo Cortez
The Theft of the Mona Lisa (Der Raub der Mona Lisa), directed by Géza von Bolváry – (Germany)
This Modern Age, directed by Nick Grinde, starring Joan Crawford and Neil Hamilton
The Threepenny Opera (Die 3 Groschen-Oper), directed by G. W. Pabst, starring Lotte Lenya – (Germany)
Tilly of Bloomsbury, directed by Jack Raymond, starring Sydney Howard and Phyllis Konstam – (GB)
Tokyo Chorus (Tōkyō no kōrasu), directed by Yasujirō Ozu – (Japan)
Tommi, directed by Yakov Protazanov – (USSR)
Tonight or Never, directed by Mervyn LeRoy, starring Gloria Swanson and Melvyn Douglas

W
Waterloo Bridge, directed by James Whale, starring Mae Clarke
A Woman of Experience, directed by Harry Joe Brown, starring Helen Twelvetrees

Serials
Battling with Buffalo Bill
Danger Island
Finger Prints
The Galloping Ghost, starring Harold Grange
Heroes of the Flames
King of the Wild
The Lightning Warrior, starring Rin Tin Tin
The Mystery Trooper
The Phantom of the West
The Sign of the Wolf
The Spell of the Circus
The Vanishing Legion

Short film series
Laurel and Hardy (1921–1943)
Charley Chase (1924–1940)
Buster Keaton (1917–1941)
Our Gang (1922–1944)

Animated short film series
Aesop's Film Fables (1921–1933)
Krazy Kat (1925–1940)
Oswald the Lucky Rabbit (1927–1938)
Mickey Mouse
 The Birthday Party
 Traffic Troubles
 The Castaway
 The Moose Hunt
 The Delivery Boy
 Mickey Steps Out
 Blue Rhythm
 Fishin' Around
 The Barnyard Broadcast
 The Beach Party
 Mickey Cuts Up
 Mickey's Orphans
Silly Symphonies
 Birds of a Feather
 Mother Goose Melodies
 The China Plate
 The Busy Beavers
 The Cat's Out
 Egyptian Melodies
 The Clock Store
 The Spider and the Fly
 The Fox Hunt
 The Ugly Duckling
Screen Songs (1929–1938)
Talkartoons (1929–1932)
 Mask a Raid (featuring Betty Boop)
Looney Tunes (1930–1969)
Flip the Frog (1930–1933)
Terrytoons (1930–1964)
Toby the Pup (1930-1931)
Merrie Melodies (1931–1969)
Scrappy (1931–1941)
Tom and Jerry (Van Beuren) (1931–1933)

Births
January 3 – Conrad Brooks, né Biedrzycki, American actor and producer (died 2017)
January 5 – Robert Duvall, American actor and director
January 9 - Paul Mantee, American actor (died 2013)
January 13 - Scott Beach, American actor (died 1996)
January 14 – Caterina Valente, French singer and actress
January 17 – James Earl Jones, American actor
January 22 - Mary Castle, American actress (died 1998)
January 25 - Dean Jones, American actor (died 2015)
January 26 – Mary Murphy, American actress (died 2011)
January 29 – Leslie Bricusse, English-born film composer and lyricist (died 2021)
January 30 - Read Morgan, American actor (died 2022)
February 6
Bryan O'Byrne, American character actor and acting coach (died 2009)
Rip Torn, American actor and director (died 2019)
Mamie Van Doren, American actress and sex symbol
February 8 – James Dean, American actor (died 1955)
February 14
Charles Hyatt, Jamaican actor, playwright and director (died 2007)
Margarita Lozano, Spanish actress (died 2022)
February 15
Claire Bloom, English actress
Mohamed Hilmi, Algerian actor and director (died 2022)
February 18 - Laura Valenzuela, Spanish television presenter and actress (died 2023)
February 20 - Karl Spiehs, Austrian producer (died 2022) 
February 24 – Dominic Chianese, American actor
February 26 - Shay Duffin, Irish character actor (died 2010)
February 28 - Gavin MacLeod, American actor (died 2021)
March 8 - Gerald Potterton, British-Canadian director, writer, producer and animator (died 2022)
March 15 - James Ellis (actor), Irish actor (died 2014)
March 20 – Hal Linden, American actor, director and musician
March 22 – William Shatner, Canadian actor
March 26 – Leonard Nimoy, American actor and director (died 2015)
March 27 - Marion Brash, American actress (died 2022)
April 1 – Ita Ever, Estonian actress
April 8 – John Gavin, American actor and diplomat (died 2018)
April 17 – Esteban Siller, Mexican voice actor (died 2013)
May 5 - Brian O'Shaughnessy (actor), British actor (died 2001)
May 10 – Ettore Scola, Italian director and screenwriter (died 2016)
May 15 - K. S. Sethumadhavan, Indian director and screenwriter (died 2021)
May 16 - Frank Albanese, American actor (died 2015)
May 18 – Robert Morse, American actor and singer (died 2022)
May 19 - James Greene (Northern Irish actor), Northern Irish actor (died 2021)
May 23
Barbara Barrie, American actress
Patience Cleveland, American actress (died 2004)
May 24 – Michael Lonsdale, British-French actor (died 2020)
May 28 – Carroll Baker, American actress
June 2 - Peter Cummins, Australian character actor
June 3 – Carmen Dell'Orefice, American supermodel and actress
June 7 - Virginia McKenna, English actress
June 14 – Marla Gibbs, American actress, singer, comedian, writer and producer
June 20
Olympia Dukakis, Greek-American actress (died 2021)
James Tolkan, American actor
July 1 – Leslie Caron, French actress and dancer
July 2
Robert Ito, Canadian actor of Japanese ancestry
Frank Williams (actor), English actor (died 2022)
July 4 – Stephen Boyd, Irish actor (died 1977)
July 5 – António de Macedo, Portuguese filmmaker, writer, university professor and lecturer (died 2017)
July 6
Donal Donnelly, Irish actor died 2010)
Della Reese, American jazz and gospel singer, actress and ordinated minister (died 2017)
July 10 – Nick Adams, American actor and screenwriter (died 1968)
July 11 – Tab Hunter, American actor and singer (died 2018)
July 14 – Mirella Ricciardi, Kenyan photographer, writer and actress
July 24 – Ermanno Olmi, Italian director and screenwriter (died 2018)
July 27 – Jerry Van Dyke, American actor, musician and comedian (died 2018)
July 28 – Darryl Hickman, American actor, voice artist, screenwriter and television executive
August 19
Elena Cotta, Italian actress
Marianne Koch, German actress
August 23 – Barbara Eden, American actress
August 12 – William Goldman, American screenwriter and novelist (died 2018)
August 31 – Noble Willingham, American actor (died 2004)
September 4 – Mitzi Gaynor, American actress, singer and dancer
September 10 – Philip Baker Hall, American actor (died 2022)
September 12
Ian Holm, English actor (died 2020)
Bill McKinney, American character actor (died 2011)
September 13 – Barbara Bain, American actress
September 17 – Anne Bancroft, American actress (died 2005)
September 20 - Ned Tanen, American producer (died 2009)
September 21 – Larry Hagman, American actor and director  (died 2012)
September 29
Eddie Barth, American actor (died 2010)
Anita Ekberg, Swedish actress and sex symbol (died 2015)
September 30 – Angie Dickinson, American actress
October 10 – Román Chalbaud, Venezuelan director
October 21 – Vivian Pickles, English actress
November 3 – Monica Vitti, Italian actress (died 2022)
November 5 - Gil Hill, American actor (died 2016)
November 6 – Mike Nichols, German-born director (died 2014)
November 10 – Don Henderson, English actor of stage, television and screen (died 1997)
November 12 – Mary Louise Wilson, American actress, singer and comedian
November 18 - Brad Sullivan, American character actor (died 2008)
November 30 – Jack Ging, American actor (died 2022)
December 2 – Nadja Regin, Serbian actress (died 2019)
December 3 - Jaye P. Morgan, retired American singer, actress and game show panelist
December 9
Paddi Edwards, British-American actress (died 1999)
William Reynolds (actor), American actor (died 2022)
December 11
Anne Heywood, British actress
Rita Moreno, Puerto Rican actress
December 14 - Abbe Lane, American singer and actress
December 20 - Mala Powers, American actress (died 2007)
December 23 – Ronnie Schell, American actor and stand-up comedian
December 24 - Robert Ridgely, American actor (died 1997)
December 28 – Martin Milner. American actor (died 2015)

Deaths
 March 11 – F. W. Murnau, German director (born 1888)
 March 24
Charles Clary, silent film actor (born 1873)
Robert Edeson, stage and screen actor (born 1868)
 June 7 – Viktor Schwanneke, German actor (born 1880)
 August 14 – Janie Marèse, French actress (born 1908)
 September 13 – Lawrence D'Orsay, English actor (born 1853)
 October 18 - Thomas Edison, inventor (born 1847)
 November 27 – Lya De Putti, Hungarian actress (born 1899)
 December 23 – Tyrone Power, Sr., stage and film veteran, father of movie star Tyrone Power (born 1869)

Film debuts
 Ralph Bellamy – The Secret Six
 Bruce Cabot – Heroes of the Flames
 Bette Davis – Bad Sister
 Melvyn Douglas – Tonight or Never
 Alexander Knox – The Ringer
 Lotte Lenya – The Threepenny Opera
 Eric Linden – Are These Our Children?
 Ida Lupino – The Love Race
 Helen Mack – The Struggle
 Otto Preminger director, producer – The Great Love
 Gene Raymond – Personal Maid
 Ralph Richardson – Dreyfus
 Simone Simon – Durand contre Durand
 Robert Young – The Black Camel

References
Citations

Bibliography

 
 

 
Film by year